Candace Elizabeth Whitaker (née White; born April 22, 1980) is an American college basketball coach who is currently women's basketball head coach at Missouri Western. Previously, Whitaker was head coach at UMKC and Texas Tech. After playing college basketball at Texas Tech, Whitaker returned to her alma mater to fill the position after former coach Kristy Curry left to coach at Alabama.  In April 2019, it was announced that Whitaker was selected as the new head women's basketball coach at Missouri Western State University.

Coaching career

Kansas City (UMKC)
In the middle of the 2006-07 season, Whitaker was named the eighth coach in Kansas City Roos' history, replacing Bo Overton. She coached her first game in the Roos' conference opener, a 51-to-48 victory over Chicago State. She coached at Kansas City until the end of the 2011-12 year, compiling an overall record of 41-65. In her time at Kansas City, Whitaker led the Roos to two separate fourth-place Summit League finishes, in 2009-10 and 2011-12.

Texas Tech University
Following Kristy Curry's departure for Alabama on May 11, 2013, Whitaker was named the new head coach at Texas Tech University on May 20, 2013. On January 1, 2018, Texas Tech fired Whitaker.

Missouri Western State University
In April 2019, it was announced that Whitaker was selected as the new head women's basketball coach at Missouri Western State University.[3]

Head coaching record

 Whitaker became interim head coach in December 2006 following the resignation of Bo Overton.

 Reflects 6 games (including 5 conference games) from 2007 to 2009 vacated due to league sanctions.

Personal life
Whitaker married her husband Matt Whitaker in April 2007. They have three sons: Westin, William, and Callahan.

References

External links

1980 births
Living people
American women's basketball coaches
Basketball coaches from Texas
Basketball players from Texas
Junior college women's basketball players in the United States
Oklahoma State Cowgirls basketball coaches
People from Canyon, Texas
Texas Tech Lady Raiders basketball coaches
Texas Tech Lady Raiders basketball players
Valparaiso Beacons women's basketball coaches
Point guards
Kansas City Roos women's basketball coaches